Christiaan Petrus Scholtz (born 22 October 1970 in Queenstown) is a former South African rugby union player, who played centre and won four caps between 1994 and 1995 playing for the South Africa national rugby union team.

Scholtz started an antiques business in Melville with his wife Sonia after retiring from rugby.

Playing career
Scholtz represented  Schools at the annual Craven Week tournament in 1987 and 1988. After school he enrolled at Stellenbosch University. In 1995 he was a member of the World Cup winning squad for South Africa. He also represented the British Barbarians.

Test history

Accolades
In 1993, Scholtz was nominated one of the five most Promising Players of the Year (under-23), along with FP Naude, Ryno Opperman, Krynauw Otto and Johan Roux.

Later career 
Scholtz is CEO and owner of Old Johannesburg Warehouse Auctioneers.

See also

List of South Africa national rugby union players – Springbok no. 618

References

External links
 
  Springboks, see 1994 42-22 Argentina

South African rugby union players
South Africa international rugby union players
Rugby union centres
1970 births
Living people
White South African people
South African people of German descent
Golden Lions players
Rugby union players from the Eastern Cape